Directive 2008/50/EC, or the Ambient Air Quality Directive, is an EU directive which limits sulphur dioxide, NO2 and other oxides of nitrogen, particulate matter (PM10, PM2,5), lead, benzene and carbon monoxide emissions from 2010. Hourly average emissions of NO2 are limited 200 μg/m3 and yearly to 40 μg/m3.  several EU member states are being sued for violating the limits: France, Spain, Italy, Hungary, Romania, Slovakia, the Czech Republic, the United Kingdom and Germany.

Directives 96/62/EC, 1999/30/EC, 2000/69/EC and 2002/3/EC were repealed by this directive, with effect from 11 June 2010.

On 15 February 2018, five member countries were urged to safeguard public health. 

On 22 February 2018, Poland was found guilty of violating the emission limits in the Radom, Pruszków-Żyrardów and Kędzierzyn-Koźle and Ostrów-Kępno districts during the eight-year period from 2007 to 2015.

See also
 TA Luft, a set of laws which implement the directive in Germany
NOx, a generic term for the nitrogen oxides which are most relevant for air pollution

References

European Union directives
2008 in law
2008 in the European Union
2010 in law
2010 in the European Union
Environmental law in the European Union